The Moonstone is a 1934 American mystery film directed by Reginald Barker and starring David Manners, Phyllis Barry, Gustav von Seyffertitz and Jameson Thomas. It is an adaptation of the 1868 novel The Moonstone by Wilkie Collins. The film retains the book's British location, but uses a contemporary 1930s setting rather than the Victorian era of the original. It is one of three film versions of the novel, which include silent versions in 1915 and 1909, although a number of television and radio adaptations have been made.

Plot summary 
As with the book, the film is based around the Herncastle Moonstone, a valuable diamond from India.

Cast 
David Manners as Franklyn Blake
Phyllis Barry as Ann Verinder 
Gustav von Seyffertitz as Carl Von Lucker
Jameson Thomas as Godfrey Ablewhite
Herbert Bunston as Sir John Verinder
Charles Irwin as Inspector Cuff
Elspeth Dudgeon as Betteredge, Housekeeper
John Davidson as Yandoo
Claude King as Sir Basil Wynard
Olaf Hytten as Dr. Ezra Jennings
Evalyn Bostock as Roseanna Spearman, Maid
Fred Walton as Henry the Butler
John Power as The Driver
Harold Entwistle as Sutter
A.C. Henderson as Robbin

Production
The film was made by Monogram Studios, one of the smaller Hollywood outfits often known collectively as Poverty Row. The adaptation of a prestigious British Victorian novel marked a break from their usual films which were generally cheaply made American-set Westerns. To fit the story into a limited running time, large amounts of the original novel are dropped from the adaptation.

References

Bibliography
 Reid, John H. B Movies, Bad Movies, Good Movies. Lulu Press, 2004.

External links 

1934 films
American mystery films
American black-and-white films
Films based on British novels
Films based on works by Wilkie Collins
Monogram Pictures films
Films set in England
Films set in Yorkshire
Films set in London
1934 mystery films
Films directed by Reginald Barker
1930s English-language films
1930s American films